Bayli Mane Lyn Cruse (born November 18, 1995) is an American softball player. She attended Northwest Whitfield High School in Whitfield County, Georgia. She later attended Tennessee Technological University, where she played catcher on the Tennessee Tech Golden Eagles softball team. During her freshman year at Tennessee Tech, Cruse was named All-OVC Newcomer while leading the Golden Eagles to an Ohio Valley Conference championship and a berth in the 2015 NCAA Division I softball tournament.

References

External links
Tennessee Tech bio

1995 births
Softball players from Georgia (U.S. state)
Living people
People from Whitfield County, Georgia
Tennessee Tech Golden Eagles athletes